No More Robots Ltd is a British video game publisher based in Manchester, England. The company was founded by Mike Rose, previously of publishing company tinyBuild, alongside investors Simon Carless and Jas Purewal. The publishing label originally found success with digital games Not Tonight and Descenders, and now works with various development studios for titles across PC and console gaming platforms.

Following the success of Descenders, No More Robots published management simulator Not Tonight, which was widely covered in the mainstream media for its dystopian take on Brexit. In 2019, the publishing label released Independent Games Festival-nominated operating system simulator Hypnospace Outlaw and card-based roguelike Nowhere Prophet. In 2020, No More Robots released kingdom management sim Yes, Your Grace, and life simulator Family Man.

Games published

References

External links 
 
 

2017 establishments in England
British companies established in 2017
Companies based in Manchester
Privately held companies of England
Video game companies established in 2017
Video game companies of the United Kingdom
Video game publishers